Gerardo Gómez Ramírez  (June 4, 1901 – November 5, 1983) was a Costa Rican politician.

1901 births
1983 deaths
Costa Rican politicians